Raquel Meroño Coello (born 8 August 1975) is a Spanish actress, presenter and businesswoman. She enjoyed popularity in Spain as television personality in the late 1990s to early 2000s.

Biography 

In 1996, Meroño became the presenter of the show Pelotas fuera, broadcast on Antena 3. She was given a supporting role in Juanma Bajo Ulloa's film Airbag (1997), playing 'Araceli', the scorned bride.

For 3 years, she starred in 390 episodes of the popular series Al salir de clase, aired on Telecinco, playing 'Paloma', a role that earned her great popularity in Spain. Cast as 'Bárbara' in Dagon (2001), Meroño co-starred with Ezra Godden in the lovecraftian horror film directed by Stuart Gordon, whose screenplay was a Dennis Paoli's adaptation of the stories Dagon and The Shadow over Innsmouth. She also starred in other horror films, namely The Mark (2003) and Beneath Still Waters (2005).

Meroño appeared in more TV series such as Esencia de poder and Paco y Veva. She also played the role of 'Mónica' in the 2006 series , aired on TVE1.
In 2008, Meroño joined the cast of Yo soy Bea in the role of 'Isabel Rocamora' (the new director of the magazine Bulevar 21), starring in 144 episodes of the TV series. She also appeared in the Arrayán soap opera, aired on the Andalusian regional channel Canal Sur Televisión.

Meroño won the 5th edition of the competitive reality cooking show MasterChef Celebrity in December 2020.

Filmography 

Television

Film

References 

21st-century Spanish actresses
Spanish television actresses
Spanish film actresses
Spanish women television presenters
1975 births
Living people
People from Madrid